545 km is a rural locality (a passing loop) in Kalarskoye Rural Settlement of Tashtagolsky District, Russia. The population was 61 as of 2010.

Streets 
 Bolotnaya
 Krupskoy
 Lugovaya
 Shosseinaya

Geography 
545 km is located 22 km north of Tashtagol (the district's administrative centre) by road. Chugunash is the nearest rural locality.

References 

Rural localities in Kemerovo Oblast